Ihor Russ (born 8 September 1988) is a Ukrainian long distance runner who specialises in the marathon. He competed in the men's marathon event at the 2016 Summer Olympics. In 2017, he competed in the marathon event at the World Championships held in London, placing 27th in 2:17:01, his season's best.

References

External links
 

1988 births
Living people
Ukrainian male long-distance runners
Ukrainian male marathon runners
Place of birth missing (living people)
Athletes (track and field) at the 2016 Summer Olympics
Olympic athletes of Ukraine